Trader Joe's is an American chain of grocery stores headquartered in Monrovia, California. The chain has 560 stores across the United States.

The first Trader Joe's store was opened in 1967 by founder Joe Coulombe in Pasadena, California. The chain was owned by German entrepreneur Theo Albrecht from 1979 until his death in 2010, when ownership passed to his heirs. The company has offices in Monrovia and Boston, Massachusetts.

History 

Trader Joe's is named after its founder, Joe Coulombe. The company began in 1958 as a Greater Los Angeles area chain known as Pronto Market convenience stores. Coulombe felt the original Pronto Markets were too similar to 7-Eleven, which he described as the "800-pound gorilla of convenience stores", concerned the competition would be too much.

Coulombe developed the idea of the Trader Joe's South Seas motif while on vacation in the Caribbean. The Tiki culture craze was still widespread in the United States in the 1960s, so in a direct nod to the fad, the Trader Joe's name itself was a spoof on Trader Vic's, the famous tiki-themed restaurant that had opened its first southern California location in the Beverly Hilton in 1955. Eating at Trader Vic's in Beverly Hills was notoriously expensive, but the Trader Joe's in Pasadena provided an irreverent and less expensive offering of food and drink. Coulombe noted two trends in the US that informed the merchandising of his new store concept: one, the number of college-educated people was rising steadily, due in part to the G.I. Bill, and two, with new jumbo jets due to premiere in 1970, international travel would be accelerating as well. A better educated, more well-traveled public were acquiring tastes they had trouble satisfying in American supermarkets at the time.

The first store branded as "Trader Joe's" opened in 1967 in Pasadena, California; it remains in operation. In their first few decades, some of the stores offered fresh meats provided by butchers who leased space in the stores, along with sandwiches and freshly cut cheese, all in-store.

In 1979, German Theo Albrecht (owner and CEO of Aldi Nord) bought the company as a personal investment for his family. Coulombe was succeeded as CEO by John V. Shields in 1987. Under his leadership, the company expanded into Arizona in 1993 and into the Pacific Northwest two years later. In 1996, the company opened its first stores on the East Coast in Brookline and Cambridge, both outside Boston. In 2001, Shields retired and Dan Bane succeeded him as CEO.

Since its inception, Trader Joe's has continued to expand across the United States. In 2004, BusinessWeek reported that Trader Joe's quintupled its number of stores between 1990 and 2001 and increased its profits tenfold. In February 2008, BusinessWeek reported that the company had the highest sales per square foot of any grocer in the United States. Two-and-a-half years later and in 2016, Fortune magazine estimated sales to be $1,750 in merchandise per square foot, more than double the sales generated by Whole Foods.

Joe Coulombe, the namesake of the brand, died in 2020. His memoir and business guide, Becoming Trader Joe, was published in 2021.

Locations

, Trader Joe's had 560 stores across 42 states in the United States with stores being added regularly. California has the largest number of stores with 192 open in the state. The chain's busiest location is its 72nd & Broadway store on the Upper West Side of Manhattan. The smallest Trader Joe's location is in the Back Bay neighborhood of Boston, Massachusetts.

Each location is designed to represent its respective area, with staff members creating murals along store walls to represent the surrounding neighborhood. Some store locations have their own "find the mascot," and children can obtain a unique collectible prize when they tell a staff member where it is "hiding," and choose a new hiding location.

Products

Private-label 
Trader Joe's sells many items under its own private labels, at a significant discount to brand-name equivalents, and requires its brand-name suppliers not to publicize this business relationship. Trader Joe's labels are sometimes named in accordance with the ethnicity of the food in question, such as "Trader Jose's" (Mexican food), "Baker Josef's" (flour and bagels), "Trader Giotto's" (Italian food), "Trader Joe-San's" (Japanese food), "Trader Ming's" (Asian food), "JosephsBrau" (beer), and "Trader Jacques'" (French food and soaps). By selling almost all of its products under its own labels, Trader Joe's "skips the middle man" and buys directly from both local and international vendors.

While a typical grocery store may carry 50,000 items, Trader Joe's stocks about 4,000 items, 80% of which bear one of its brand names. Products include gourmet foods, organic foods, vegetarian foods, frozen foods, imported foods, domestic and imported wine and beer (where local law permits), and "alternative" food items, such as vegan and vegetarian options.

Product availability and discontinued products 
Trader Joe's discontinues individual products more often than larger grocery chains. A product may be discontinued because of a variety of reasons: it may be a seasonal product; the cost of producing the item may have increased, thereby also increasing its cost; or the item wasn't selling strongly enough. New items are introduced every week, so Trader Joe's may remove current items to make room for new products on its shelves. Stores often have a "new items" case with 10 to 15 products (that can also be found in the rest of the store), indicating an intentional high turnover of products.

Product selection and prices may also differ from state to state. For freshly-prepared items (e.g., deli, bakery, dairy and juice), Trader Joe's tries to source products as close to the stores as possible, which may result in variations with recipes and prices. State laws, taxes, deposit requirements, and distribution costs can also influence how products are priced in each location.

Other product notes 
In February 2016, because of customer feedback, Trader Joe's announced their goal "to have all the eggs [they] sell in western states (CA, OR, WA, AZ, NM and CO) come from cage-free suppliers by 2020 and all the eggs [they] sell nationally to come from cage-free suppliers by 2025".

Trader Joe's is the exclusive retailer of Charles Shaw wine, popularly known as "Two Buck Chuck" because of its original $1.99 price tag in California (local prices vary). Of the wine selection at Trader Joe's, Coulombe has said, "We built Trader Joe's on wine first, then food. I tasted 100,000 wines, and most weren't wonderful. They were submitted to us by desperate vintners". Upon the death of Fred Franzia of the Charles Shaw label in September 2022, The New York Times reported Trader Joe's had sold over one billion bottles. The company leaves names of wineries off the labels on purpose, although many are from Bronco Wine, the company behind Charles Shaw.

In October 2022, CNN reported the company was bringing back free samples after a pandemic-era restriction was relaxed.

The company produces a list of its most popular items each year. The fourteenth year of the survey, results for which were reported in January 2023, showed Chili & Lime Flavored Rolled Tortilla Chips as the top overall product and the favorite snack; the Sparkling Honeycrisp Apple Juice as the favorite beverage; Trader Joe's Cheddar Cheese with Caramelized Onions as the favorite cheese; Trader Joe’s Butter Chicken as the favorite entrée; seasonal candles as the favorite household item; bananas as the favorite produce item; Hold the Cone! Mini Ice Cream Cones as the favorite desert; and the Cashew & Basil Pesto as the favorite vegan/vegetarian item. Some winners from years past were retired and put into the firm's Product Hall of Fame.

Sustainability efforts 
Trader Joe's states that "a continuing focus of [their] sustainability initiatives is maintaining product integrity and preventing food waste."

Improving packaging 
Trader Joe's has been taking steps to make its products more environmentally friendly. In 2019, Greenpeace delivered a petition of 100,000 signatures for Trader Joe's to phase out single-use plastics. In response to customer pressure, Trader Joe's committed to stop offering single-use carryout bags nationwide; replace its produce bags with biodegradable and compostable options; replace styrofoam trays; and sell more loose, unwrapped produce.

In 2021, as part of an ongoing effort to improve packaging, Trader Joe's stated that it had improved over 200 products by eliminating excess components, and increasing the amount of recycled and sustainably sourced materials. The company also removed over 4 million pounds of plastic packaging from their products in 2021. Examples of improvements include removing plastic mesh packaging from produce, converting plastic clamshells for produce to sealed fiber trays, and increasing the number of frozen entrees in a plastic tray with a compostable option.

Phasing out unsustainable foods 
In October 2007, amid customer concerns, Trader Joe's began to phase out foods imported from China, and from February to April 2008, Trader Joe's phased out single-ingredient products from China because of customer concerns. Between 2012 and 2013, Trader Joe's moved from 15th on Greenpeace's CATO (Carting Away the Oceans) scale to third by removing six unsustainable species of fish from its shelves and getting involved in efforts to protect the Bering Sea Canyons.

Eliminating food waste 
Trader Joe's claims that in 2021, approximately 99.5% of all products were sold in stores, donated to food recovery partners, or composted. Through its "Neighborhood Shares Program," Trader Joe's donates 100% of the unsold products to local food recovery organizations. In 2021, this amounted to more than $349 million worth of products to non-profit partners, and nearly 63 million meals served to local communities.

Ratings
In May 2009, Consumer Reports ranked Trader Joe's the second-best supermarket chain in the United States (after Wegmans). In June 2009, MSN Money released its annual Customer Service Hall of Fame survey results, in which Trader Joe's ranked second in customer service. From 2008 to 2010, Ethisphere magazine listed Trader Joe's among its most ethical companies in the United States, but it did not make the list in 2011. In 2014, Consumer Reports again ranked Trader Joe's a top-scoring supermarket chain. The company ranked number 23 among the 2019 Glassdoor best places to work in the US, and number 14 in 2020.

Criticism

Climate and sustainability

Trader Joe's ranked poorly in a 2013 Greenpeace report on sustainable food.

The retailer has been characterized as "notoriously secretive" and it has also been criticized for a lack of transparency by management about the sources of products such as organic milk. Trader Joe's scores the lowest on Green America's chocolate scorecard, as the retailer shares very little about addressing child labor or deforestation caused by the chocolate it sells.

In a 2016 settlement with the Environmental Protection Agency and Department of Justice, Trader Joe's violated the Clean Air Act by emitting high global warming potential (GWP) and ozone-depleting refrigerants. The company was tasked with reducing its emissions and creating a process to track and repair refrigerants, and was required to use refrigerants with an ultra-low GWP in 15 stores. Since then, the company has not shared its progress to reduce leak rates or publicly report its climate emissions.

Labor

In September 2013, in response to the implementation of the Affordable Care Act (ACA), Trader Joe's stated that it would require part-time employees to work an average of 30 hours per week in order to qualify for medical insurance (with free coverage for basic dental and vision care still being available for all crew members who work an average of 15 hours or more per week). Part-time employees who were not qualifying for medical insurance would now be eligible for plans which were available under the ACA (but they would only be made available to those employees whose employers do not offer them an insurance plan). Those employees who were working full-time were unaffected. Maeg Yosef, a union organizer who has worked for 18 years at the Hadley, Massachusetts store, said the company cut contributions to employee retirement plansfrom the equivalent of 15% of an employee's annual pay down to nothingsince she started there. Workers at the Trader Joe's grocery store in Hadley announced in an open letter dated May 14, 2022 to the company's CEO their intent to push for unionization citing stagnated wages and a desire for better pay, benefits and workplace conditions.

Trader Joe's has been accused of union busting when a store in Hadley, Massachusetts organized for a union election with the National Labor Relations Board.

Product branding 
In 1977, the company began introducing international-sounding variants of its brand for some of its private label ethnic food items, such as "Trader José", "Trader Joe San", and "Trader Giotto" for Mexican, Japanese, and Italian products respectively. The company also referenced other cultures with branding like "Trader Ming's", "Arabian Joe's", and "Pilgrim Joe" for Chinese, Middle Eastern, and Thanksgiving-themed American products. In July 2020, during the George Floyd protests, an online petition signed by 5,300 people asked the company to rename these products, criticized their labeling as "racist" and accusing the company of promoting "a narrative of exoticism that perpetuates harmful stereotypes".

The company reacted by stating that it was already in the process of reverting a number of international foods back to Trader Joe's branding, and that this decision had already been made several years earlier. Trader Joe's later clarified that some branding referenced in the petition will remain, stating: "We disagree that any of these labels are racist. We do not make decisions based on petitions." The petition itself has been criticized on social media for promoting cancel culture and for "wasting time on a trivial issue".

Economic exclusivity and gentrification 
In spite of being known as a "neighborhood store" with affordable options, Trader Joe's locations are mostly in well-off neighborhoods. In 2022, the typical Trader Joe's customer was a married person living in an urban area, between 25 and 44 years old, earning at least $80,000. When deciding where to open locations, the chain typically looks for areas where the median household income is over $100,000. In effect, this systemically contributes to the "food desert" phenomenon, where residents in certain areas may have limited access to nutritious food.

Conversely, Trader Joe's has also faced opposition for contributing to gentrification. Between 1997 and 2014, Zillow found that homes grow more rapidly in value if they are closer to a Trader Joe's or Whole Foods, with such homes consistently being worth more than the mean U.S. home. In 2014, Trader Joe's agreed to halt plans to open a store in a historically black neighborhood in Portland, Oregon, following protests led by the Portland African American Leadership Forum. The organization objected to the $2.4 million subsidy offered by the city to Trader Joe's and emphasized that they were not against Trader Joe's, but instead were pushing back against the city's history of displacing African Americans. In 2015, along with a proposal to build new affordable housing, the city announced that a different store, Natural Grocers, would be built on the vacant lot.

See also
 2018 Los Angeles hostage incident
 Pirate Joe's

References

Further reading

External links

 
 "Meet the Original Joe", Fortune, August 23, 2010
 "Should America Be Run by ... Trader Joe's?", Freakonomics Radio, November 28, 2018 podcast about choice architecture, efficiency, frugality, collaboration, and team spirit

 
Aldi
American companies established in 1958
Retail companies established in 1958
American subsidiaries of foreign companies
Companies based in Los Angeles County, California
Supermarkets of the United States
1958 establishments in California
Supermarkets based in California
Monrovia, California
1979 mergers and acquisitions